The Newton Abbot power station was a power station originally built in 1898 at Jetty Marsh, Newton Abbot as a small station to serve the local community.  It was subsequently significantly expanded, and changed from direct current to alternating current when bought by the Torquay corporation in the 1920s to provide power across a wider area towards the coast.

It reached its peak capacity of 52.5 megawatts in 1948 - the same year that it was nationalised..  The station was used less from the mid-1960s as more efficient plant was used via the national grid, and it was finally closed in 1974 with demolition following shortly after.  The site is now a housing estate.

History
From the late 1890s, both Newton Abbot and Torquay developed their own electricity generating capacity to serve the local areas.  The Newton Abbot Electricity Generating Station was established with all direct current (DC) supply, being used mainly for industrial loads.

The site was located at Jetty Marsh, adjacent to the Moretonhampstead and South Devon Railway branch of the Great Western Railway, and between the River Teign and River Lemon.  This allowed the station to receive coal deliveries both by rail, and by barge at the jetty.  The power station also drew water from the Teign, before discharging it again in the Lemon.

In 1923 the station was operated by the Urban Electricity Supply Company Limited. The electricity plant comprised 3 × 90 kW and 1 × 250 kW reciprocating engines and generators producing 240 & 480 V DC. In 1923 the station generated 708,402 kWh of electricity, some of this was used in the plant, the total amount sold was 526,171 kWh. The revenue from sales of current was £4,332, this gave a surplus of revenue over expenses of £1,029.

In the 1920s, the Torquay Corporation acquired the Newton Abbot power station, and built a new station to replace their aging unit at Beacon Quay on Torquay seafront.  The new station, serving both Newton Abbot and Torquay, was opened in 1924, and was continually expanded until the last major investment in 1948.  During the development of the high pressure section of the power station in 1940 a single, large cooling tower was built to satisfy the condenser demands or the new boilers, and this was a dominant feature of the Newton Abbot Skyline. The cooling tower had a rated capacity of 1,000,000 gallons per hour (1.26  m3/s)

The plant at the station comprised:

 two Stirling boilers each 33,000 pounds per hour, operating at 265 psi and 650 °F,
 two Stirling boilers each 50,000 pounds per hour, operating at 265 psi and 750 °F,
 four Stirling boilers each 100,000 pounds per hour, operating at 425 psi and 825 °F,
 two 15 MW British Thomson-Houston turbo-alternators generating at 11 kV 50 Hz,
 two 7.5 MW British Thomson-Houston turbo-alternators generating at 11 kV 50 Hz,
 two 3.3 MW British Thomson-Houston turbo-alternators generating at 11 kV 50 Hz,
 one 225 kW Belliss turbo-alternator, 520 Volt DC,
 three rotary converters, 2 × 400 kW one 500 kW.

In 1948, electricity supply was nationalised, and the station became the responsibility of the British Electricity Authority (1948-1955) then the Central Electricity Authority (1955-1957) and finally the Central Electricity Generating Board (1958-1974). The electricity distribution and sales functions of the local authority were vested in the South Western Electricity Board.  Once connected to the national grid, it was a smaller and less efficient station, and usage gradually declined, including long periods of 'cold' shutdown. In 1972 the output from the station was 27.106 GWh, and the load as a percentage of the output capacity was 8.8 per cent.

The station was finally closed in 1974, and demolished shortly after.

A Bellis and Morcom steam generating engine was preserved and survives at Poldark Mine museum in Cornwall where it has been since 1972. Of the triple expansion type its believed to date from 1920.

Installed generating capacity over time 

The output of the station is shown below.

References

Former power stations in England
Power stations in South West England
Buildings and structures in Devon
Newton Abbot